The Special Operations Forces Exhibition and Conference (SOFEX) is a special operations and homeland security event that is held every two years at the King Abdullah I airbase in Marka, Jordan. The specialized event is held under the patronage of King Abdullah II, the supervision of Prince Faisal bin Al Hussein and is supported by the Jordanian Armed Forces (JAF).

Background
SOFEX was established in 1999 by King Hussein. 

In 2012, SOFEX attracted 33 national pavilions, represented by 323 companies and which attracted thousands of visitors over the 3 day exhibition, including 108 delegations from 56 countries. 

The 10th edition of the SOFEX series took place May 5-8, 2014.

The SOFEX 2020 has been announced as postponed on 2020-01-30 due to heavy rains at the expo location.

See also
International Defence Exhibition (IDEX) – a defense expo in Abu Dhabi, United Arab Emirates
Eurosatory - a defense expo in Paris, France
Egypt Defence Expo (EDEX) - tri-service defence exhibition in Cairo, Egypt

References

External links
 
 . VICE (5 July 2012)

Special forces
Arms fairs
Trade fairs in Jordan